Robert Lane or Bob Lane may refer to:

Politicians
Robert Lane (died 1768), British Member of Parliament for York
Robert Lane (born 1527), MP for Gatton and Northamptonshire
Bob Lane (Canadian politician), Progressive Conservative party member of the Canadian House of Commons
Bob Lane (American politician) (born 1947), Republican member of the Georgia House of Representatives

Others
Robert Lane (soccer) (1882–1940), Canadian amateur football (soccer) player who competed in the 1904 Summer Olympics
Robert E. Lane (1917–2017), American political scientist and political psychologist
Robert J. Lane, Supreme Secretary of the Knights of Columbus
Robert W. Lane (born 1949), Chairman of Deere & Co, company main board director
Bob Lane (Australian footballer) (1946–1979), Australian rules footballer
Bob Lane (American football) (born 1959), gridiron football player
Robert Lane (pirate) (died 1719), pirate who left Edward England to sail the Caribbean; occasionally just called "Captain Lane"

See also
Bob Saget (Robert Lane Saget, 1956-2022), American stand-up comedian, actor and television host